Liddington is a village and civil parish near Swindon in Wiltshire, England.

History 
The parish has been an area of settlement since the earliest times. The ancient Ridgeway traverses the parish just north of the village and the Iron Age hill-fort known as Liddington Castle, which is a scheduled monument, overlooks the present-day village. Liddington is recorded in the late Saxon period, around 940 AD. The Domesday Book of 1086 refers to the settlement as Ledentone. Records indicate that Liddington was a fairly prosperous parish in the 14th century. The population of the parish peaked at 454 in 1841 and then gradually declined.

'Starfish' decoy control bunker 
Liddington Hill is the site of a control bunker for a World War II 'Starfish' bombing decoy site. This would have been used to control fires, which would have acted as a decoy to enemy planes targeting the town of Swindon to the north.

The bunker had a hatch in its concrete roof and consisted of two rooms off a central passage; the room on the right housed generators, while the control room was on the left.

Economy
Just east of the village is the children's adventure centre PGL Liddington, based at the historic King Edward's Place. Whilst the centre takes its name from Liddington as the nearest village, the centre is in the neighbouring parish of Wanborough.

References

External links

 Community website

Civil parishes in Wiltshire
Villages in Wiltshire
Borough of Swindon